Harold Amos (September 7, 1918 – February 26, 2003) was an African American microbiologist and professor. He taught at Harvard Medical School for nearly fifty years and was the first African-American department chair of the school.

Early life
Amos was born in Pennsauken, New Jersey to Howard R. Amos Sr., a Philadelphia postman, and Iola Johnson. Iola Johnson was adopted and educated by a Philadelphia Quaker family.  Due to the close relationship between Iola and the Quaker family, the Amos family received a lot of books, including a biography of Louis Pasteur. Excelling as a student, Amos graduated in 1936 at the top of his class from Camden High School in New Jersey. He attended Springfield College in Massachusetts on a full academic scholarship. In 1941 he graduated summa cum laude with a degree in biology(major) and  chemistry(minor). He was drafted the following year, and after returning home from WWII in 1946, Amos began his graduate studies at Harvard University. He was the first African American to earn a doctoral degree from the Division of Medical Sciences, Harvard Medical School, in 1952.

Military service
Amos was drafted into the US Army in 1942, serving in the Quartermaster's Corps in World War II as a warrant officer. During his time in the Army, he travelled along the coast of France where he eventually started speaking very fluently in the language while becoming an expert on the foods and wines. Eventually he was discharged in February 1946, where he began to start his next career in the program of Biological Science at Harvard University.

Career

In September 1947, Springfield College hired him as a biology professor. Dr. Amos was the college’s first African American faculty member. Amos was awarded a M.A. in 1947 and a Ph.D. in 1952 from Harvard Medical School. He was a graduate student with Howard J. Mueller. Harold thesis was on the infectivity of Herpes virus. After graduating, he was awarded a Fulbright scholarship that took him to the Pasteur Institute for two years. Amos joined the Harvard Medical School faculty in 1954, working as a teacher. He was the chairman of the bacteriology department from 1968 to 1971 and again from 1975 to 1978. In 1975, he was named the Maude and Lillian Presley professor of microbiology and molecular genetics. He was a presidential advisor to Richard Nixon, a Fellow of the American Academy of Arts and Sciences (1974), the Institute of Medicine and the American Association for the Advancement of Science. In 1988 Amos received professor emeritus status. Amos was awarded the National Academy of Sciences' Public Welfare Medal in 1995 and the Harvard Centennial Medal in 2000. He directed the Minority Medical Faculty Development Program (MMFDP) of the Robert Wood Johnson Foundation after his retirement from Harvard. A diversity award at Harvard Medical School is named after Amos. He inspired hundreds of minorities to become medical doctors. He was well known as an inviting and welcoming mentor to both students and junior faculty members.

Awards 

 Howard University’s Dr. Charles R. Drew World Medical Prize in 1989
 National Academy of Sciences' Public Welfare Medal in 1995
 Harvard Centennial Medal in 2000
 Fellow of the American Academy of Arts and Sciences
 Fellow of the American Association for the Advancement of Science

Publications 
Harold Amos research was mostly recognized on the work about his bacterial metabolism, nutrition, animal cell culture, virology, and the effects of hormones. During his time at Harvard University he began working on a thesis on virology that was affecting herpes virus that was experimented on chick's chorioallantoic membrane which led to his big break from Fulbright Fellowship that supported his work on mutation of the E. coli bacteria which led to Amos's research focused on using cells in culture to understand how molecules get into cells and how entry is regulated during cell starvation or in plentiful conditions. Amos published over seventy scientific papers. As part of the department of chair for Bacteriology and Immunology one his famous studies was research over the animal cells that was focused on the RNA metabolism that broke down the enzyme inductions and their functions that were later published in his book called Harvard Gazette that focused on the glucose starvation, hexose metabolism and transport.

Harold Amos Medical Faculty Program 
"The mission of the Robert Wood Johnson Foundation is to improve the health and health care of all Americans. Since its inception, the Foundation has supported efforts to improve the number and quality of minority health care professionals. Recognizing that there was an existing pool of talented minority medical residents who had the potential to become medical school faculty members, and that a critical requirement for success was for those potential academicians to forge links with appropriate mentors who have exemplary track records in producing outstanding medical faculty, the Foundation developed the Minority Medical Faculty Development Program in 1983 (renamed the Harold Amos Medical Faculty Development Program, or AMFDP, in 2004 in honor of its first director)."

The ideas of this program believed that his role to the University of Harvard was to help push the narrative of many minority students that weren't able to gain support to pursue a medical career as a physician.  By the facility and board directors supporting Harold in this regime it has shown an increase of many minority students that have exceeded the numbers of non minority faculty.  In regards of the program Harold Amos believed with this program it would allow students to gain the opportunities like himself while passing on his knowledge to other students in the program.  As for today his program has changed nearly over 124 participants in the years of 2003- 2008 that were (76 scholars and 48 non scholars) that were able to gain leadership qualities plus grants that were covering at least 3/4 of the semester while there in the program.

In regards of program the most known alumni was  man named Dr. James Gavin III quoted "It has been an immeasurable honor to play a part in realizing the Harold Amos program’s goal of building and developing a cadre of brilliant young physicians and dentists who go on to make significant contributions to the field of academic medicine. Our scholars and alumni make up one of the richest endowments of human capital with which I have ever been affiliated. Being part of that for three decades has helped fulfill my commitment to develop programs that create sustainable, positive change." By the help of this program Dr. Gavin believed that this committee helped him establish a great relationship between him and the facility  that was able to advocate the workforce for many minorities that were capable to be a part of the growing medical regime.

References

External links
 Tribute at the Harvard Medical School
 Harvard Gazette obituary
 Harold Amos papers, 1949-2003. HMS c476. Harvard Medical Library, Francis A. Countway Library of Medicine, Boston, Mass.

1918 births
2003 deaths
20th-century American scientists
United States Army personnel of World War II
African-American biologists
Fellows of the American Academy of Arts and Sciences
Fellows of the American Association for the Advancement of Science
Harvard Medical School alumni
Members of the National Academy of Medicine
People from Pennsauken Township, New Jersey
Springfield College (Massachusetts) alumni
20th-century African-American scientists
21st-century African-American people
Fulbright alumni